Ab Barik-e Kuchek (also Romanized as Āb Bārīk-e Kūcheḵ; also known as Āb Bārīk) is a village in Hablerud Rural District, in the Central District of Firuzkuh County, Tehran Province, Iran. At the 2006 census, its population was 15 in 6 families.

References 

Populated places in Firuzkuh County